The 25th Lumières Awards ceremony, presented by the Académie des Lumières, took place on 27 January 2020 to honour the best in French films of 2019. It was broadcast for the first time on Canal +.

Nominees

See also
 45th César Awards
 10th Magritte Awards

References

External links
 
 
  at AlloCiné

Lumières
Lumières
Lumières Awards
Lumières Awards
Lumières Awards